Klisino  is a village located in Poland, in the Opole Voivodeship, Głubczyce County and Gmina Głubczyce. The settlement was first historically mentioned in the year 1245.

References

Villages in Głubczyce County